In Euclidean plane geometry, Lester's theorem states that in any scalene triangle, the two Fermat points, the nine-point center, and the circumcenter lie on the same circle.
The result is named after June Lester, who published it in 1997, and the circle through these points was called the Lester circle by Clark Kimberling.
Lester proved the result by using the properties of complex numbers; subsequent authors have given elementary proofs, proofs using vector arithmetic, and computerized proofs.

See also
 Parry circle
 
 van Lamoen circle

References

External links 

Theorems about triangles and circles